Okenia cupella is a species of sea slug, specifically a dorid nudibranch, a marine gastropod mollusc in the family Goniodorididae.

Distribution
This species was described from Chesapeake Bay, United States.

References

Goniodorididae
Gastropods described in 1970